Zilfa Estcourt (born Zilpha Eugenie Phillips, May 3, 1883 – December 17, 1959) was an American newspaper columnist and editor. Described variously as "the dean of west coast woman writers" and as being "to newspapers what Ethel Barrymore is to the stage," Estcourt was the women's editor at the Tacoma Tribune and San Francisco Chronicle.

Early life and career
On May 3, 1883, Zilpha Eugenie Phillips was born in Black River Falls, Wisconsin, the oldest of four children born to Thomas Henry Phillips and Emma Eugenie Jesse. Sometime between 1991 and 1900, the family relocated to Tacoma, Washington, and, in 1904, Pillips received a Bachelor of Art's degree from Whitworth College in Spokane. At that time, she was awarded a scholarship to the University of Chicago, where she earned her Master's degree the following year.

Death
On December 17, 1959, Estcourt, whose health had been failing since her retirement in 1949, died in a San Francisco nursing home.

References

Further reading
 
 "Tacoma Girl Who Gained Distinction". The Tacoma Daily Ledger. May 15, 1904. p. 6
 "Women's Club News". The Tacoma Daily Ledger. May 11, 1913. p. 32
 “Anniversary Sale Items Intensely Interesting to the Thrifty; Better Babies contest Ends Saturday at 4:30”. The Tacoma Times. October 16, 1914. p. 8
 "Washington State Federation of Women's Clubs; Chairmen of Committees". Official Register and Directory of Women's Clubs in America. 1916. p. 210
 "Tacoma Tribune in New Home". The Fourth Estate. December 21, 1918. p. 21 
 Phillips, Zilfa (May 8, 1919). "Tacoman Declares Poisoner Insane". The Tacoma News Tribune. p. 1 
 Estcourt, Zilfa (September 30, 1923). "Biennial Looms Large on Club Horizon". San Francisco Chronicle. p. 6
 "Divorce Set Aside, Ithacan's Second Marriage Bigamous". The Ithaca Journal. January 22, 1925. p. 5
 "Reno Now Scene of Estcourt Suit". The Tacoma News Tribune. January 27, 1926. p. 1
 Estcourt, Zilfa (April 15, 1926). "As a Woman Thinketh". Los Angeles Daily News. p. 17
 Estcourt, Zilfa (April 19, 1926). "As a Woman Thinketh". Los Angeles Daily News. p. 11
 Estcourt, Zilfa (September 6, 1934). "Ikebana Told to Garden Club; Illustrated talk Given by S.F. Women". Nichi Bei Shinbun. p. 8
 "Estcourt, Well Known Writer, Passes in N. Y.".  September 10, 1937.The Chico Enterprise. p. 8
 "Zilfa Estcourt Describes the Press, Its Importance". The Santa Rosa Press Democrat. p. 5
 Estcourt, Zilfa (September 28, 1946). "Earth, Sun, Sea Colors in West Coast Clothes". Pittsburgh Post-Gazette. p. 20
 McClure, Kathryn (May 4, 1948). "Zilfa Estcourt Gives Talk on Women in Changing World". The Modesto Bee. p. 6
 "Estcourt Funeral Tomorrow". The San Francisco Examiner. December 21, 1959. p. 35

1883 births
1959 deaths
20th-century American journalists
American women columnists
American women editors
Journalists from Wisconsin
University of Chicago alumni
Whitworth University alumni